Irom Prameshwori Devi (born 1 May 1989) is an Indian footballer who plays as a forward for Kickstart FC. She has been a member of the India women's national team.

Honours

India
 SAFF Women's Championship: 2012, 2014, 2016
 South Asian Games Gold medal: 2016

Eastern Sporting Union
Indian Women's League: 2016–17

Gokulam Kerala
Indian Women's League: 2019–20

Railways
 Senior Women's National Football Championship: 2015–16

Manipur
 Senior Women's National Football Championship: 2013–14, 2019–20, 2021–22
 National Games Gold medal: 2022

Individual
 Indian Women's League Most Valuable Player: 2017–18

International goals

References

1989 births
Footballers from Manipur
Living people
India women's international footballers
Indian women's footballers
People from Imphal
Sportswomen from Manipur
Women's association football forwards
Footballers at the 2014 Asian Games
Asian Games competitors for India
Eastern Sporting Union players
Gokulam Kerala FC Women players
Indian Women's League players
South Asian Games gold medalists for India
South Asian Games medalists in football